Woodend is a town in the Waimakariri District, in the Canterbury Region of the South Island of New Zealand.  It may have been named because it was on the edge of what was then called the Maori Bush, or after an early settler, Thomas Wooding. It is situated with both the Waimakariri and Ashley / Rakahuri Rivers running either side. Woodend is 6.6 kilometres north of Kaiapoi and 6.3 kilometres to the east of Rangiora. Woodend is within walking distance of the town of Pegasus. 

Woodend is located near Woodend Beach. It is possible to go swimming, surfing, walking, running and horse riding there. The Tūhaitara Coastal Park is known for its walking and mountain biking trails. The Tutaepatu Trail links Woodend Beach, Pegasus Town and Waikuku Beach.

Climate 
The warmest months of the year are January and February, with an average high temperature of 23°C. The coldest month of the year occurs in July, when the average high temperature is 11°C. Monthly rainfall ranges between an average of 34mm in January and April to 63mm in July.

Education
Woodend School is Woodend's only school. It is a state co-educational full primary school with a decile rating of 8 and a roll of  students (as of

Demographics 

Woodend had a population of 2,784 at the 2018 New Zealand census, an increase of 45 people (1.6%) since the 2013 census, and an increase of 123 people (4.6%) since the 2006 census. There were 984 households, with 987 occupied private dwellings and a further 27 unoccupied private dwellings There were 1,410 males and 1,374 females, giving a sex ratio of 1.03 males per female. The median age was 43 years (compared with 37.4 years nationally), with 528 people (19.0%) aged under 15 years, 480 (17.2%) aged 15 to 29, 1,335 (48.0%) aged 30 to 64, and 441 (15.8%) aged 65 or older.

Ethnicities were 93.9% European/Pākehā, 9.8% Māori, 1.6% Pacific peoples, 1.7% Asian, and 1.6% other ethnicities (totals add to more than 100% since people could identify with multiple ethnicities).

The proportion of people born overseas was 15.6%, compared with 27.1% nationally.

Although some people objected to giving their religion, 57.5% had no religion, 31.0% were Christian, 0.1% were Hindu, 0.2% were Buddhist and 2.8% had other religions.

Of those at least 15 years old, 294 (13.0%) people had a bachelor or higher degree, and 486 (21.5%) people had no formal qualifications. The median income was $33,300, compared with $31,800 nationally. The employment status of those at least 15 was that 1,173 (52.0%) people were employed full-time, 387 (17.2%) were part-time, and 57 (2.5%) were unemployed.

Ravenswood 
A large subdivision called Ravenswood is being built on the northern edge of Woodend. The first residents moved in in 2019. It is expected to eventually have 1500 homes built on it, significantly enlarging the town of Woodend. The subdivision will include 13 hectares of commercial buildings including a petrol station, fast food restaurant and a supermarket. The subdivision was first launched in 2014 but was delayed after the death of the developer Bob Robertson.

Government 
The Waimakariri District Council provides local government services to Woodend. Woodend is part of the Waimakariri  electorate.

Notable buildings

Saint Barnabas Church 

Saint Barnabas is the Woodend - Pegasus Anglican Parish Church. It replaced a previous church built on the site which was built in 1859-60. The previous church was condemned due to dry rot. The current church was designed by architect Cecil Wood in 1930 and opened in June 1933. In 1993 an extension containing meeting rooms and kitchen facilities was completed. This was designed by architect Don Donnithorne.

Woodend Methodist Church 

The Woodend Methodist Church was built in 1911. It was damaged in the 2010-2011 Christchurch Earthquakes and has subsequently been repaired.

Transport 
State Highway 1 runs through the middle of Woodend. Traffic volumes have been increasing every year and reached 20,000 cars per day in 2019.  Frustrated local residents blocked State Highway 1 in February 2020 in protest. In September 2020, the traffic lights which had been promised by the New Zealand Transport Authority (NZTA) in 2020 to make crossing State Highway One had been delayed. The NZTA expects traffic volumes to double over the next 30 years. Its preferred solution is to build a new four-lane bypass which will join the current motorway at Lineside Road and run through to the entrance to Pegasus town. This proposed bypass has yet to be funded by the New Zealand government, In March 2021, it was listed as an "on the horizon" project only in Canterbury’s draft Regional Land Transport Plan.

Notable residents
Anton Cooper (born 1994), cross-country cyclist and World Under 23 Cross-country champion
Catharine Squires, known as Kate, was a Plymouth Brethren preacher

References

Statistics New Zealand 2006 Census Data

Waimakariri District
Populated places in Canterbury, New Zealand